Sudbury is the largest city in Northern Ontario. The tallest building in the city is the 17-storey,  Rockview Towers.

There are no high-rises currently under construction or approved for construction. But 3 proposed for construction in Sudbury, to be an extension to the Cherry Gardens complex.

Tallest buildings
This list ranks buildings in Greater Sudbury that stand at least 30 m (98.4 ft) tall, based on CTBUH height measurement standards. This includes spires and architectural details but does not include antenna masts.

Other significant structures

Inco Superstack

The Superstack is approximately 15 cm (6") shorter than the Empire State Building in New York City. It is also the second tallest freestanding structure of any type in Canada, ranking behind the CN Tower but ahead of First Canadian Place, and the 27th tallest freestanding structure in the world. The Superstack sits atop the largest nickel smelting operation in the world at Inco's Copper Cliff processing facility in the city of Greater Sudbury.

It was constructed in 1972 by Inco Limited (now Vale) at an estimated cost of 25 million dollars; from the date of its completion until the GRES-2 chimney was constructed in 1987, it was the world's tallest smokestack. Between the years 1972–75 it was the tallest freestanding structure in Canada.

The structure was built to disperse sulphur gases and other byproducts of the smelting process away from the city itself. As a result, these gases can be detected in the atmosphere around Greater Sudbury in a  radius of the Inco plant. Prior to the construction of the Superstack, the waste gases contributed to severe local ecological damage.

In 2018, Vale announced that the stack will be decommissioned and dismantled beginning in 2020.

Science North

Science North is an interactive science museum.

The complex, which is Northern Ontario's most popular tourist attraction, consists of two snowflake-shaped buildings on the southwestern shore of Lake Ramsey, just south of the city's downtown core, as well as a former ice hockey arena which includes the complex's entrance and an IMAX theatre. The snowflake buildings are connected by a rock tunnel, which passes through a billion-year-old geologic fault. This fault line was not known to be under the complex during the construction of the building in the early 1980s. Where the walkway reaches the larger snowflake, the Inco Cavern auditorium is frequently used for temporary exhibits, as well as for press conferences and other gala events.

See also

List of historic places in Greater Sudbury
 List of tallest buildings in Ontario

References

Greater Sudbury
 
Tallest buildings in Sudbury